Article 1 of the European Convention on Human Rights is the first article of the European Convention on Human Rights. It states that "The High Contracting Parties shall secure to everyone within their jurisdiction the rights and freedoms defined in Section I of this Convention".

Jurisdiction
The "jurisdiction" of member states has been challenged several times at the Court, the principle question being to what extent jurisdiction is territorial in nature. The court has struck a path between recognising exceptions to the regional nature of the treaty and    

In Loizidou v Turkey (Preliminary Objections) (1995) 20 EHRR 99 the European Court of Human Rights stated:
Bearing in mind the object and purpose of the Convention, the responsibility of a Contracting Party may also arise when as a consequence of military action - whether lawful or unlawful - it exercises effective control of an area outside its national territory. The obligation to secure, in such an area, the rights and freedoms set out in the Convention derives from the fact of such control whether it be exercised directly, through its armed forces, or through a subordinate local administration.
Therefore actions of Turkey in Turkish controlled Northern Cyprus were found to be covered by the Convention.

Notable cases
Issa v Turkey (2004) 41 EHRR 567
Ocalan v Turkey (2005) 41 EHRR 985
Bankovic v Belgium (2007)
Al-Skeini and others v Secretary of State for Defence [2007] UKHL 26

References

External links
Text of Article 1 of the European Convention on Human Rights
Guide on Article1of the European Convention on Human Rights

1